Charles-Louis Rochat, born Charbonnières 20 November 1946, was a member of the Conseil d'État (government) of Vaud from 1998 to 2007. He was a member of the Liberal Party.

Politics 
April 1998: he was elected to the Conseil d'État and became part of the Department for Health and Social Action (DSAS).
From 30 November 2004 until 2007: conseiller d'État in charge of the Department of Security and the Environment (DSE).

External links 
 page on the internet site of the Canton of Vaud

1946 births
Living people
Canton of Vaud politicians